William James Pearson (11 June 1922 – 6 December 2010) was an Australian rules footballer who played for Essendon in the Victorian Football League (VFL) during the 1940s.

Pearson served in the Australian Army during World War II, seeing active duty as an AIF gun layer in the New Guinea jungle.

Pearson was recruited from La Mascotte and in just his third league game kicked four goals to help his club defeat Carlton by 100 points. He was the centreman in the Essendon premiership side of 1946 and finished tenth in that season's Brownlow Medal count with 13 votes, the most by an Essendon player.

A knee injury in 1947 ended Pearson's career when a series of operations, five in total, weren't enough to allow him to play again.

References

External links

1922 births
2010 deaths
Essendon Football Club players
Essendon Football Club Premiership players
Australian rules footballers from Melbourne
Australian Army personnel of World War II
One-time VFL/AFL Premiership players
People from Carlton, Victoria
Military personnel from Melbourne